The following is a list of massacres that have occurred in Syria.

Syrian Republic/Arab Republic

Islamist uprising in Syria

Syrian civil war

See also
 List of massacres during the Syrian civil war
 List of massacres in Ottoman Syria

References

Massacres
Syria

Massacres